The waterhole, or water hole, is an especially quiet band of the electromagnetic spectrum between 1420 and 1662 megahertz, corresponding to wavelengths of 21 and 18 centimeters, respectively. It is a popular observing frequency used by radio telescopes in radio astronomy.

The strongest hydroxyl radical spectral line radiates at 18 centimeters, and atomic hydrogen at 21 centimeters (the hydrogen line). These two molecules, which combine to form water, are widespread in interstellar gas, which means this gas tends to absorb radio noise at these frequencies. Therefore, the spectrum between these frequencies forms a relatively "quiet" channel in the interstellar radio noise background.

Bernard M. Oliver, who coined the term in 1971, theorized that the waterhole would be an obvious band for communication with extraterrestrial intelligence, hence the name, which is a pun: in English, a watering hole is a vernacular reference to a common place to meet and talk. Several programs involved in the search for extraterrestrial intelligence, including SETI@home, search in the waterhole radio frequencies.

See also
BLC1
Wow! signal
Radio source SHGb02+14a
Schelling point

References

External links
SETI: The Radio Search (page 2)
"What Is the Water Hole" (has a cleaner diagram)
Planetary.org: A Blueprint for SETI
How SETI Works Discusses the water hole.
"waterhole" entry in The Encyclopedia of Astrobiology, Astronomy, and Spaceflight'
"The ABCs of SETI: the search for extraterrestrial intelligence"
"SETI: The water hole" from Astronomy Now 
"SETI Observations" from SETI Institute

Electromagnetic spectrum
Search for extraterrestrial intelligence